Alberta Provincial Highway No. 42, commonly referred to as Highway 42, is a  highway in central Alberta, Canada that connects Highway 2A in Penhold, about  south of the city of Red Deer, to Highway 21 near the Hamlet of Lousana.

Major intersections 
From west to east.

References 

042